The Baicheng Ring Expressway, designated as S17 is an expressway in Northwestern Chinese province of Jilin going around the city of Baicheng.  This expressway is a branch of G12 Hunwu Expressway.

Detailed Itinerary

References

Expressways in Jilin